Star Wars: Episode II – Attack of the Clones is a video game based on the film of the same name. The game was first announced by THQ and LucasArts in early February 2002, months prior to the film's release.

Gameplay

Over the course of eleven levels, the player is able to play as three of the film's main protagonists: Obi-Wan Kenobi, Mace Windu and Anakin Skywalker. They are also able to fight various enemies, as well as bosses such as Count Dooku and Jango Fett. The game's plot covers important events from Attack of the Clones such as Anakin battling the Sand People, Obi-Wan tracking Jango and his son Boba, and the Jedi Order's climactic battle with Dooku and the Separatists.

The levels play across planets from the film including Tatooine, Coruscant and Geonosis, and can differ in terms of gameplay. Most levels are played in a 2D side-scrolling beat 'em up manner on foot, in which the player's lightsaber can be used for slashing and deflection attacks. Some levels play out as 3D first-person vehicular chase sequences, such as the speeder chase through Coruscant in pursuit of bounty hunter Zam Wesell early in the film.

Reception

The game was met with generally negative reception. Reasons include its control issues, simple difficulty, poor level designs and dated password system. Game Informer gave it an abysmal 1 out of 10, calling it "the dark side of gaming." The game so far has a score of 38.89% from GameRankings and 38 out of 100 from Metacritic.  However, a few reviewers, including IGN, thought the game was fine and gave a more forgiving review of it.

References

External links
 

2002 video games
Game Boy Advance games
Game Boy Advance-only games
LucasArts games
Space opera video games
Star Wars: Episode II – Attack of the Clones video games
THQ games
Video games developed in the United Kingdom
Video games scored by Allister Brimble